Robert Collins Gallagher (born July 7, 1948) is a former outfielder in Major League Baseball who played from  through  for the Boston Red Sox (1972), Houston Astros (1973–74) and New York Mets (1975). Listed at 6' 3", 185 lb., he batted and threw left-handed. His grandfather, Shano Collins, was a Major League outfielder/manager and a player in the 1917 and 1919 World Series.

Gallagher attended Bellarmine College Preparatory before attending Stanford University and being selected by the Los Angeles Dodgers in the 17th round of the 1968 June Amateur Baseball draft.

In a four-season career, Gallagher was a .220 hitter (56-for-255) with two home runs and 13 runs batted in in 213 games played, including 34 runs, one triple, and one stolen base.

He had been teaching high school social studies for the last 25 years at Santa Cruz High School in Santa Cruz, California. In 2010, he retired from teaching and currently works as a substitute teacher for Santa Cruz High School.

External links
, or Baseball-Almanac, or The Ultimate Mets Database
Bob Gallagher at Society for American Baseball Research

1948 births
Living people
Baseball players from San Jose, California
Baseball players from Massachusetts
Major League Baseball outfielders
Boston Red Sox players
Houston Astros players
New York Mets players
Stanford University alumni
Stanford Cardinal baseball players
Arizona Instructional League Dodgers players
Bakersfield Dodgers players
Albuquerque Dodgers players
Spokane Indians players
Louisville Colonels (minor league) players
Iowa Oaks players
Tidewater Tides players
Phoenix Giants players
Alaska Goldpanners of Fairbanks players
Bellarmine College Preparatory alumni